The Jaguari River is a river of São Paulo state in southeastern Brazil. It is a tributary of the Paraíba do Sul.

The headwaters are protected by the  Mananciais do Rio Paraíba do Sul Environmental Protection Area, created in 1982 to protect the sources of the Paraíba do Sul river.
The  Fernão Dias Environmental Protection Area, created in 1997, also protects some of the headwaters.

See also
List of rivers of São Paulo

Notes

References
 
 Rand McNally, The New International Atlas, 1993.

Rivers of São Paulo (state)